Christianity is the second most followed religion in Manipur, a state in Northeast India, according to 2011 census data of India.

Followers
Protestants (mostly Baptist) outnumber Catholics in Manipur. A Manipur Baptist Convention exists.
The Reformed Presbyterian Church North-East India Synod has its seat in Manipur. The Presbyterian Church in India and the Church of Christ are present in the state, too. The Roman Catholic Archdiocese of Imphal has its seat in the state. The Manipur Section of the Seventh-day Adventist Church has about forty congregations.
The All Manipur Christian Organisation (AMCO) exists.

Demography

Trends
Percentage of Christians in Manipur by decades

Tribes
Percentage of Christians in the Scheduled Tribes

List of denominations 
Sources

Evangelical Congregational Church
United Pentecostal Church International
Kuki Baptist Convention
Kuki Christian Church
Manipur Baptist Convention
The Pentecostal Mission
Presbyterian Church in India (Reformed)
Roman Catholic church
Manipur Evangelical Lutheran Church (49) 8,500 
Christian Revival Church

See also
 List of Christian denominations in North East India
 Christian Revival Church

References